Santa Pod Raceway, located in Podington, Bedfordshire, England, is Europe's first permanent drag racing venue for 1/4 and 1/8 mile racing. It was built on a disused Second World War air base, (RAF Podington), once used by the USAAF's 92nd Bomb Group. The drag racing venue opened at Easter in 1966, and it is now the home of European drag racing and hosts both the first and last round of the FIA and FIM/UEM European Drag Racing Championship, along with the British National Drag Racing Championships. It has also been the venue for the annual Volkswagen Beetle Bug Jam weekend since 1987.

History

Podington airfield, near the villages of Hinwick and Podington, was formerly a Second World War airbase.  In 1966 permission was obtained to use the airfield as a drag racing complex, the ¾ of a mile main runway being used as the drag strip. Santa Pod was named after Santa Ana Drags, a drag strip in California, USA, and the local village of Podington. Since then the name Santa Pod has become synonymous with the sport of drag racing in Europe. Today the raceway hosts events throughout the year including the FIA European Drag Racing Championships and the 'Run What You Brung' (RWYB) events where anyone with a valid driving licence can have a go and put their own vehicles and skills to the test. This also serves as a "grassroots" recruitment ground, as many who start by running their road vehicle on the track for bragging rights often progress to the next level and become competitors in National Events after obtaining a licence from one of the official sanctioning bodies; Auto-Cycle Union or Motorsport UK.

Santa Pod is the venue at which the current world drag racing record, a time of 3.58 seconds at 386.26 mph (621.61 km/h) was set by Sammy  Miller in his Vanishing Point rocket-propelled funny car in July 1984. Another record has also been set at Santa Pod, the world's fastest jet car (notably Santa Pod's "resident") Fireforce 3 piloted by Martin Hill broke the record in Easter 2005 with a terminal speed of 336.10 mph (540.88 km/h). Several other European drag racing records have been set along with records unsurpassed outside the United States. In May 2010 Top Fuel dragster driver Urs Erbacher set a class speed record with a terminal speed of 314.87 mph reached in less than 5 seconds. At the same race meeting Eric Teboul set a time of 5.23 seconds at 249 mph on his Hydrogen Peroxide Rocket Bike, which he further improved to 5.19 seconds at the European championships in September 2010. In 2012 drag-racer Andy Frost set the record of `the world's fastest accelerating road-legal car' at the UK's Santa Pod Raceway. In September 2010, 47-year-old Briton Perry Watkins drove a racing vehicle decorated as a formal dining table complete with tablecloth, chairs, place settings, food and various vessels. The vehicle was dubbed "The Fast Food". It performed 2 runs at Santa Pod, topping out at 130 mph and achieving an average speed of 113.8 mph.

Santa Pod for many years remained the fastest all-asphalt dragstrip in the world since most North American tracks are partially or entirely concrete in construction. However, during the winter of 2017/2018, the entire length of the track was lifted and replaced with a track constructed entirely in concrete, the reasoning being that concrete gives more consistent times as it, “moves around less” than asphalt.

Since 1987, it has hosted the annual Bug Jam weekend.

In popular culture
Santa Pod appears in Led Zeppelin's concert film The Song Remains The Same. Drummer John Bonham drove a dragster at the raceway for his showcase scene in the film.

See also
Drag racing

References

Further reading
 Crazy horses: the history of British drag racing by Brian Taylor, foreword by Don Garlits, Haynes Pub., 2009,

External links
 Official Santa Pod website
 Site offering live coverage of Drag Racing events at Santa Pod and other venues
 Santa Pod's Governing Body for European Drag Racing
 Photos and video shot at Santa Pod by Brian Fawcus
 Ultimate Street Car (USC) official site
 Bug Jam VW Show

Drag racing venues in Europe
Motorsport venues in England
Sports venues in Bedfordshire
Sports venues completed in 1966